"Fly" is a song by American rock band Sugar Ray. It appears on their 1997 album Floored twice: one version with reggae artist Super Cat (track four) and the other without (track 13). The song was serviced to US radio in May 1997.

"Fly" became the band's first hit, holding the  1 spot on the US Billboard Hot 100 Airplay chart for four consecutive weeks and spending eight weeks at No. 1 on the Modern Rock Tracks chart. It was ineligible to chart on the Hot 100 because a physical CD single was not released commercially in the US. The song also reached No. 1 on Canada's RPM 100 chart and peaked at No. 31 in Australia.

As a result of the success of "Fly", Floored sold well and was certified double platinum. The song was included on VH1's countdown of the "100 Greatest Songs of the '90s" at number 52.

Composition and music
"Fly" is an alternative rock, reggae, reggae fusion, and pop rock song, that incorporates elements of dancehall and ska. 

Sugar Ray's lead singer Mark McGrath explained that this song had a bouncy beat, yet it was about death; "Fly" too seemed like a bright, up-tempo song but "there is this stark imagery in there. There's loss in it. There is loss of a mother, obviously. I thought it was a good way to juxtapose the lyrics with the melody on that, similar to what Gilbert O'Sullivan did on "Alone Again (Naturally)." The other members wrote it without him as McGrath left during a rehearsal, and McGrath originally did not want to record the song and was downright wanting to quit the band, as we was preferring heavier music, "just wanted to scream and yell because I was scared to be onstage in the first place", and afraid his voice would not work with a mellower tune. His friend McG, who would eventually direct the video for "Fly", convinced him otherwise, telling about the song's merits and asking ‘Where else you gonna go--work at Del Taco?’

Charts

Weekly charts

Year-end charts

Release history

See also
 List of RPM number-one singles of 1997
 List of RPM Rock/Alternative number-one singles
 List of Mainstream Top 40 number-one hits of 1997 (U.S.)
 Number one modern rock hits of 1997

References

1997 singles
1997 songs
Atlantic Records singles
Lava Records singles
Music videos directed by McG
Reggae fusion songs
RPM Top Singles number-one singles
Song recordings produced by David Kahne
Songs about death
Sugar Ray songs